Anatoliy Alekseevich Nogovitsyn (29 April 1952 – 5 November 2019) was a Russian military official. He served as the Deputy Chief of General Staff of the Armed Forces of the Russian Federation. Holding the rank of Colonel General, he was known for being the primary spokesman of the Russian Armed Forces during 2008 South Ossetia War and for warning Poland about the possibility of a nuclear strike on 15 August 2008 after an agreement reached between the United States of America and Poland on 14 August 2008 about hosting part of a US missile defense shield in Poland.  President Dmitry Medvedev later played down the nuclear attack threats against Poland.

Biography
In 1973 he graduated with honors from Armavir Higher Military Aviation School of Pilots. In 2012, he was dismissed, officially for age reasons.

Nogovitsyn died in Moscow on 5 November 2019.

References

External links
 Biography of Nogovitsyn from Lentapedia
 After Georgia, Moscow issues nuclear warning to Poland, The Independent, Saturday, 16 August 2008

1952 births
2019 deaths
Russian colonel generals
Burials at the Federal Military Memorial Cemetery
Military Academy of the General Staff of the Armed Forces of Russia alumni
Zhukov Air and Space Defence Academy alumni